The South Africa men's national under-18 field hockey team represents South Africa at international field hockey matches and tournaments.

Tournament record

Youth Olympic Games
2014 - 4th

African Youth Games
2018 -

Current squad

The squad was announced on 27 June 2018.

Head coach: Sihle Ntuli

See also
South Africa men's national field hockey team
South Africa men's national under-21 field hockey team

Notes

References

Field hockey
Field hockey in South Africa